The 1991–92 season of the Dutch Eredivisie was contested by 18 teams. PSV won the title.

League standings

Results

Promotion/relegation 
The number 16 of the Eredivisie would play against relegation against the runners-up of the promotion/relegation play-offs of the Eerste Divisie. The Eerste Divisie league champions and winner of the play-offs would replace the numbers 17 and 18 of this league directly.

Go Ahead Eagles: promoted to Eredivisie 
FC Den Haag: relegated to Eerste Divisie

Topscorers

See also 
 1991–92 Eerste Divisie
 1991–92 KNVB Cup

References 

 Eredivisie official website - info on all seasons 
 RSSSF

Eredivisie seasons
Netherlands
1991–92 in Dutch football